The Digul River is a major river in southern Papua province, Indonesia, on the island of New Guinea. It is the fourth longest river in New Guinea after Sepik River, Mamberamo  River and Fly River.

History 
The swamplands upstream were known by the name "Boven-Digoel" (Above the Digul, in Dutch) and hosted a penal colony at Tanahmerah (Red Earth) in the early 20th century, when Indonesia was a colony of Holland.  As a result of the abortive 1926 revolt by the Communist Party of Indonesia (PKI), the Dutch exiled 823 of the most troublesome revolutionaries here.

Hydrology 
Rising on the southern slopes of Maoke Mountains, the Digul flows first south and then west to empty into the Arafura Sea. For much of its length it travels across a low region of extensive swamps and creates a delta near Dolak (Yos Sudarso Island, formerly Frederik Hendrik) Island.

Geography

The river flows in the southern area of Papua with predominantly tropical monsoon climate (designated as Am in the Köppen-Geiger climate classification). The annual average temperature in the area is 22 °C. The warmest month is April, when the average temperature is around 24 °C, and the coldest is June, at 20 °C. The average annual rainfall is 3072 mm. The wettest month is January, with an average of 464 mm rainfall, and the driest is July, with 28 mm rainfall.

References

Landforms of Western New Guinea
Rivers of South Papua
Rivers of Indonesia